WYLS (670 AM, "Rejoice 670") is a radio station licensed to serve York, Alabama, United States.  The station, founded in 1970, is owned by Sarah and William Grant, through licensee Grantell Broadcasting, LLC. WYLS is a Class D station broadcasting on the clear-channel frequency of 670 kHz.

WYLS broadcasts a black gospel music format.

History
This station began licensed operation on 1350 kHz with 5,000 watts of power in November 1970.  Owned by William P. Grant d/b/a Grantell Broadcasting Company, the new station was assigned the WYLS call letters by the Federal Communications Commission.

WYLS made national headlines when the Associated Press reported that the station's soft drink machine still dispensed bottles of soda for just a nickel. The article made humorous reference to the commodity price ceilings and wage controls in the United States imposed by President Richard Nixon from 1971 to late 1973.

In July 1987, the station applied for a construction permit that would allow a change in broadcast frequency to 670 kHz. The permit was granted on October 20, 1987, and the station began licensed operation on the new frequency on January 28, 1988.

In 2003, William P. Grant died and, per the terms of his will, control of the station and the broadcast license passed to his wife, current owner Sarah P. Grant.

References

External links

Gospel radio stations in the United States
Radio stations established in 1970
Sumter County, Alabama
1970 establishments in Alabama
YLS
YLS